Terry Gerald Eades (5 March 1944 — 4 October 2021) was a Northern Irish former professional  footballer who played in Football League for Cambridge United and Watford.

Career
Eades made his debut in senior football for Chelmsford City on 20 March 1963, playing in a 3–1 loss against Guildford City after graduating from the club's academy. During Eades' time at Chelmsford, he made 363 appearances, scoring six times. 

In 1969, after helping Chelmsford to the 1968 Southern League title, Eades signed for Cambridge United for a fee of £2,500. On 31 March 1969, Eades scored on his league debut for Cambridge in a 2–0 win against Bedford Town. Eades was part of the Cambridge side that won two successive Southern League titles, helping the club gain election to the Football League in 1970. In 1976, after captaining Cambridge, Eades moved out on loan to Watford for a short period. Eades returned to Chelmsford City for a short spell in 1977.

In 1978, Eades signed for Histon, later managing the club. In April 1980, Eades was given a testimonial by Cambridge, with Ron Atkinson's West Bromwich Albion providing the opposition.

Eades died on 4 October 2021 from cancer at the Arthur Rank Hospice, at the age of 77.

References

External links
 Terry Eades stats at Neil Brown stat site

1944 births
2021 deaths
Association footballers from Northern Ireland
English Football League players
Chelmsford City F.C. players
Cambridge United F.C. players
Watford F.C. players
Histon F.C. players
Association football defenders
Histon F.C. managers
Football managers from Northern Ireland
British people of Irish descent
Sportspeople from County Down
People from Banbridge
Deaths from cancer in England